Drifting and Dreaming is a studio album of phonograph records by Bing Crosby with a South Sea Islands flavour. It is one of less than 10 Bing Crosby albums to be featured on all three speeds (LP, 45 rpm and 78 rpm).

Track listing

Original release
These songs were featured on a four-disc, 78 rpm album set, Decca Album No. A-578.

Disc 1 (25185):A.  "Drifting and Dreaming"B.  "It's Been a Long, Long Time"Disc 2 (25186):A. "Where the Blue of the Night (Meets the Gold of the Day)B. "The Waltz You Saved for Me"Disc 3 (25187):A. "When You're a Long, Long Way from Home"B. "When I Lost You"Disc 4 (25188):A. "I'm Drifting Back to Dreamland"B. "The Singing Sands of Alamosa"

Other releases
The album was also issued as a 10" vinyl LP in 1949 with the catalogue number DL 5119.

In 1950, the album was issued as a set of four 7" vinyl 45rpm discs (catalogue No. 9-113).

A further LP release took place in 1956 when a 12" album was released with the title "Drifting and Dreaming" (DL 8268). This took the original eight sides and added four more.

Track listing of 12" LP
Recording dates follow song titles.

References

Bing Crosby compilation albums
1947 compilation albums
Decca Records compilation albums